S/2011 J 3 is a small outer natural satellite of Jupiter discovered by Scott S. Sheppard on 27 September 2011, using the 6.5-meter Magellan-Baade Telescope at Las Campanas Observatory, Chile. It was announced by the Minor Planet Center 11 years later on 20 December 2022, after observations were collected over a long enough time span to confirm the satellite's orbit.

References 

Himalia group
Moons of Jupiter
Irregular satellites
20110927
Discoveries by Scott S. Sheppard
Moons with a prograde orbit